Johann Jakob Heckel (23 January 1790 – 1 March 1857) was an Austrian taxidermist, zoologist, and ichthyologist from Mannheim in the Electoral Palatinate.

Life
Though not a formally trained biologist, he worked his way up through the ranks to eventually become the director of the Fish Collection at the Naturhistorisches Museum in Vienna. For the most part, he was not a traveler or explorer like many of the scientists of the time, he remained in Vienna, where he studied and catalogued specimens sent to him from the field. Among those who brought specimens to him were Karl Alexander Hügel, Joseph Russegger and Theodor Kotschy — involving collection activities in Kashmir, the Middle East and northeastern Africa that greatly enriched the Vienna museum. Fish were his specialty and he worked with many of the greatest ichthyologists of his time including Cuvier, Valenciennes, Bonaparte, Müller, and Troschel.

In the fields of systematics and taxonomy, he made significant contributions in his investigations of cyprinids. He wrote more than 60 works, the most notable of which is "The freshwater fishes of the Austrian Danubian monarchy". He worked on it for more than 24 years but died before its final publication, most likely from bacteria he was exposed to while getting a skeleton from a dead sperm whale.

Works
 Cyprinen, Scaphirhynchus und andere ichthyologica (1836–1840), with Johann Natterer — Cyprinidae, Scaphirhynchus and other ichthyologica.
  Fische aus Caschmir, (1838), with Karl Alexander Hügel — Fish of Kashmir. 
 Die Süßwasserfische der österreichischen Monarchie, mit Rücksicht auf die angränzenden Länder bearbeitet (with 204 woodcuts) - The freshwater fishes of the Austrian monarchy, processed with regard to adjacent countries, with Rudolf Kner (1858).
 Beiträge zur kenntniss der fossilen fische Österreichs, (1856) — Contribution to the knowledge of Austrian fossil fish.
 Neue Beiträge zur Kenntniss der fossilen Fische Österreichs, (1861), with Rudolf Kner — New contribution to the knowledge of Austrian fossil fish.

Legacy

Fish named after him include:
The cichlid Acarichthys heckelii (J. P. Müller & Troschel, 1849) was named in his honor.
The Pike Cichlid Crenicichla heckeli Ploeg, 1989 was named in his honor.

See also
:Category:Taxa named by Johann Jakob Heckel

References
''Austrian Natural History Museum at Naturhistorisches Museum

1790 births
1857 deaths
Scientists from Mannheim
People from the Electoral Palatinate
Taxidermists
Austrian ichthyologists
Members of the Hungarian Academy of Sciences